Mount Pleasant is a historic home located at Hague, Westmoreland County, Virginia. It was built in the 19th century (1887), and is a three-story, Queen Anne style frame dwelling.  It features a wraparound porch with turned posts and sawn brackets, four brick chimneys, and a central projecting tower with a pyramidal roof.  Also on the property are a contributing smokehouse, a carriage barn, and a well house.

It was listed on the National Register of Historic Places in 2002.

References

Houses on the National Register of Historic Places in Virginia
Queen Anne architecture in Virginia
Houses completed in 1887
Houses in Westmoreland County, Virginia
National Register of Historic Places in Westmoreland County, Virginia